Karlstein may refer to places in:

 Germany

 Karlstein am Main, a municipality in Landkreis Aschaffenburg, Bavaria
 part of Bad Reichenhall, Bavaria
 a rock with a ruin there
 Karlstein bei Hornberg, a rock in Hornberg, Baden-Württemberg
 part of Regenstauf, Landkreis Regensburg, Bavaria
 Schloss Karlstein, the castle there
 Aussichtspunkt Karlstein, a site above Weinstadt, Baden-Württemberg

 Austria
 Karlstein an der Thaya, a municipality in Lower Austria, Austria
 Schloss Karlstein, the castle there
 Internierungslager Karlstein an der Thaya, a former internment camp there

 Czech Republic
 Karlštejn Castle, a 14th-century castle in Central Bohemia
 Karlštejn (Beroun District), městys named after the castle
 Karlštejn, nature reserve nearby the castle
 Hunting castle Karlštejn nearby village Svratouch in Pardubice Region (Chrudim District)
 Karlštejn, administrative part of village Svratouch, named after the hunting castle
 Karlštejn, hill in Žďárské vrchy where the hunting castle is situated

cs:Karlštejn (rozcestník)